Kadel is a village in Bajhang District in the Seti Zone of north-western Nepal. At the time of the 1991 Nepal census it had a population of 3,816 and had 693 houses in the village.

References

Populated places in Bajhang District